The Arctic redpoll or hoary redpoll (Acanthis hornemanni) is a bird species in the finch family Fringillidae. It breeds in tundra birch forest. It has two subspecies, A. h. hornemanni (Greenland or Hornemann's Arctic redpoll) of Greenland and neighbouring parts of Canada, and A. h. exilipes (Coues' Arctic redpoll), which breeds in the tundra of northern North America and the Palearctic. Many birds remain in the far north; some birds migrate short distances south in winter, sometimes travelling with common redpolls.

The genus name Acanthis is from the Ancient Greek akanthis, a name for a small now-unidentifiable bird, and hornemanni commemorates the Danish botanist Jens Wilken Hornemann. The name "arctic redpoll" is used in Europe and "hoary redpoll" in North America.

Description
The Arctic redpoll is similar in appearance to the common redpoll but generally paler. It may be distinguished from that species by the unstreaked pale rump patch and the uniformly pale vent area. The Greenland race is a very large, pale bird, with the male sometimes described as a "snowball", but both forms are pale with small beaks, white rumps and often more yellow than grey-brown tones in their plumage. They have black bibs, orangish forehead patches and two light-coloured stripes on each wing. The females are more streaked on their breasts, sides and rumps, but are still pale. Wingspan ranges from 20 to 25 cm.

Behaviour
The Arctic redpoll is partially migratory and tends to move southwards in November and north again in March and April. It feeds mainly on seeds, particularly of alder and birch trees.

Breeding takes place from May to July. The nest is built low down in a tree or bush and is neatly built with an outer layer of twigs, a middle layer of root fibres, fragments of juniper bark and lichens and an inner layer of down, willow buds and reindeer hair. Three to seven pale blue eggs with light reddish speckling are laid and incubated by the female. They hatch after about eleven days and the young fledge in about a further thirteen days.

References

External links

Oiseaux.net Photos, text, map
 
 
 Hoary Redpoll Species Account – Cornell Lab of Ornithology

Arctic redpoll
Birds of the Arctic
Arctic redpoll
Arctic redpoll
Holarctic birds
Taxobox binomials not recognized by IUCN